Jean Céa (born 1932 in Aïn Témouchent) is a French mathematician.

Born from Spanish immigrants in Algeria (he learnt French in school), he studied at the Ecole normale d'instituteurs d'Oran and the École normale supérieure de Saint-Cloud, obtaining his Ph.D. in 1964 with his dissertation Approximation variationnelle des problèmes aux limites. In his thesis he proved the Céa's lemma, an important result related to the error estimation in the Finite Element Method.

He is emeritus professor at the University of Nice Sophia Antipolis and member of the Academia Europaea. In 1975 he was awarded with the Poncelet Prize.

Works 
 Approximation variationnelle des problèmes aux limites, Annales de l'Institut Fourier 14, vol 2, pp. 345–444, 1964, pdf
 Optimisation: théorie et algorithmes, Dunod 1971
 Lectures on optimization: theory and algorithms, Tata Institute of Fundamental Research, Springer 1978, pdf
 Approximation et méthodes itératives de résolution d'inéquations variationnelles et de problèmes non linéaires,  Institut de recherche d'information et d'automatique (IRIA), Rocquencourt 1974
 Une vie de mathématicien. Mes émerveillements, Harmattan 2010
 Jeunes pousses en folie, Harmattan 2012 (Roman)

References 

1932 births
Living people
20th-century French mathematicians
21st-century French mathematicians
Members of Academia Europaea